Helmut Hartmann (born 2 February 1936) is a German equestrian. He competed in two events at the 1968 Summer Olympics.

References

External links
 

1936 births
Living people
German male equestrians
Olympic equestrians of East Germany
Equestrians at the 1968 Summer Olympics
People from Damme